Alzano Lombardo is a  in the province of Bergamo, Lombardy, northern Italy.

Alzano received the honorary title of city with a presidential decree of 11 March 1991. It is home to the San Martino Museum of Religious Art and the Basilica of San Martino.

References

Cities and towns in Lombardy